Events from the year 1677 in France.

Incumbents 
Monarch: Louis XIV

Events
 
 
 
 
 
 January 1 – Jean Racine's tragedy Phèdre is first performed.
 August – The guild of the Maitresses bouquetieres is founded in Paris.
 October 29 – Michel le Tellier becomes chancellor of France.
 November 16 – French troops occupy Freiburg.
 Jules Hardouin Mansart begins la place Vendôme in Paris (completed in 1698).
 End of the use of male impotence as a factor in French divorce proceedings.
 Ice cream becomes popular in Paris.
 The population of Paris first exceeds 500,000.

Births
 

 
 February 8 – Jacques Cassini, French astronomer (d. 1756)
 May 4 – Françoise-Marie de Bourbon, youngest daughter of Louis XIV and Madame de Montespan, wife of Philippe d'Orléans, le Régent (d.1749)

Deaths

See also

References

1670s in France